St Ambrose Barlow RC High School is a secondary school located in Wardley, Greater Manchester, England. The school is named after St Ambrose Barlow, one of the Forty Martyrs of England and Wales.

The school serves a wide range of parishes including St Charles' RC Primary School in Swinton, St Mark's RC Primary School in Pendlebury, St Mary's RC Primary School in Swinton, St Luke's RC Primary School in Irlams o' th' Height, St Edmund's RC Primary School in Little Hulton and Christ the King RC Primary School in Walkden. St Ambrose Barlow has been accredited with many national awards including National Teaching School status, the School Inclusion Award and Dyslexia Friendly Status. The majority of pupils are baptised Roman Catholic.

History
The school was established in the 1950s on land at Shaftesbury Road in nearby Swinton.

In April 2013, the school moved into a new building in Wardley near Swinton. St George's RC High School closed in August 2014 with most pupils transferring to St Ambrose Barlow.

Ofsted
In 2018 an inspection of the school was carried out in accordance with Section 48 of the Education Act 2005. The Diocese of Salford awarded the school "Good" in all seven categories.

At the latest inspection carried out by Ofsted in 2018, the school was rated as "requires improvement"

Leadership
Executive Principal, Mrs. C. M. Garside, was awarded CBE for Services to Education in January 2015.

Mr Ben Davis was appointed as the Headteacher of St Ambrose Barlow in 2015.

In popular culture
The old site of St Ambrose Barlow was used for filming the CBBC show 4 O'Clock Club for both interior and exterior shots. The site was first used for filming in the summer of 2013 for the third series which began airing in January 2014. The site continued to be the building for the fictional Elmsmere Manor High School until 2017 when production moved to a former school in Walkden.

The former site is currently used as the set for series 11 of Waterloo Road, which was broadcast on BBC One in early 2023.

References

External links
Department for Children, Schools, and Families page about the school
St Ambrose Barlow RC High School, Ofsted report

Catholic secondary schools in the Diocese of Salford
Secondary schools in Salford
Voluntary aided schools in England
Educational institutions established in 1955
1955 establishments in England